Jacques Mercanton (1909–1997) was a French cinematographer.

Selected filmography
 The Bread Peddler (1934)
 Zouzou (1934)
 Girls of Paris (1936)
 Gibraltar (1938)
 Ultimatum (1938)
 Personal Column (1939)
 Happy Go Lucky (1946)
 Paris Vice Squad (1951)
 Alone in Paris (1951)
 Passion (1951)
 Wild Fruit (1954)
 Girls of the Night (1958)
 Women's Prison (1958)
 Prostitution (1963)

References

Bibliography
 David Bellos. Jacques Tati: His Life and Art. Random House, 2001.

External links

1909 births
1997 deaths
French cinematographers
People from Neuilly-sur-Seine